Carolina High School (sometimes referred to as Carolina Academy or CHS) is located in Greenville, SC. It is a public and magnet high school in Greenville County School District.  It serves ninth through twelfth grade students. The student population comes primarily from students who live in nearby neighborhoods and students who are enrolled in the magnet program. Tanglewood Middle School is one of the public middle schools that feed into Carolina High School.

Carolina High School moved to its current location in 2006. The new facility was part of a district-wide building plan that aimed to improve Greenville County Schools. This offered Carolina High School a brighter atmosphere, updated systems (such as new HVACs), dedicated laboratory spaces, dedicated music rooms, dedicated band rooms, and two gymnasiums.

The former school building was opened in September 1956. Carolina High School was a segregated school until 1968. Gwendolyn Dandy McGowens, a social studies teacher, was the first African-American teacher on the Carolina Academy staff.

The school's magnet program includes the engineering academy, led by Mr. Jones, who was preceded by Mr. Roberson (a former engineer who studied at Florida University and MIT) The school also offers a health academy, which is now led by Erin Driggers. The former teacher of the health academy now serves as the Magnet Program Coordinator.

References

Public high schools in South Carolina
Schools in Greenville County, South Carolina
Education in Greenville, South Carolina
Magnet schools in South Carolina
1953 establishments in South Carolina
Educational institutions established in 1953